Tres Islas is a locality in Cerro Largo Department in Uruguay. It is the head of the Municipality of Tres Islas.

Geography
Tres Islas is located in the western part of the department of Cerro Largo, on the hill of the same name, north of the Quebracho Stream, and next to a secondary road that joins it with Route 7.

Population
In 2011, Tres Islas had a population of 195.
 
Source: Instituto Nacional de Estadística de Uruguay

References

Populated places in the Cerro Largo Department